The Ruqqad is a wadi flowing in south-west Syria, and de facto also in Northeast Israel. It flows into the Yarmouk River, of which it is one of the main tributaries, and forms the topographical eastern boundary of the Golan Heights. It marks the south-east part of the de facto border between the Israel-annexed part of the Golan Heights and the Syrian-held part of the region.

The Battle of Yarmuk between the Byzantines and Muslims in 636 took place in an area bordered by Wadi ar-Raqqad, close to its junction with the Yarmuk River.

Name
The name is written as Wadi ar-Raqqad, al Raqqad, Ruqqad or Ruqqād, in different combinations. The word is derived from the root RQD and means more or less to sleep or lie down.

References

Valleys of Syria
Golan Heights
Rivers of Syria
Rivers of Israel